Barry Dean Karl (born July 23, 1927 in Louisville – died July 7, 2010) was an American educator.

Education
He received a bachelor's degree from the University of Louisville in 1949, a master's from the University of Chicago in 1951, and a Ph.D. from Harvard University in 1961.

Career
He was the associate editor in the Humanities and History at the University of Chicago Press (1951–53). At Harvard, he was the executive secretary to the Committee on General Education (1959–1961) and senior tutor at Eliot House (1961–62). He was professor of History at Washington University in St. Louis (1962–68), professor of History at Brown University (1968–71) and the University of Chicago (1970–1996) where he held the Norman and Edna Freehling Chair in History and the Social Sciences. He chaired the Department of History from 1976 to 1979. At the University of Chicago he chaired the Faculty Committee of the Benton Program for Fellowships in Broadcast Journalism in Broadcast Journalism (1982–86) and the Committee to Plan the University's Centennial. From 1982 to 1988, he served as special advisor to President Hanna Gray. He was also an avid pianist.

Bibliography
Executive Reorganization and Reform in the New Deal (1963)
Charles E. Merriam and the Study of Politics (1974)
The Uneasy State: The United States from 1915 to 1945 (1983)

External links
"Barry Karl Named First Bloomberg Professor", The Harvard University Gazette, May 15, 1997.
"Barry D. Karl, historian of America politics and expert on philanthropy, 1927-2010", "The University of Chicago," July 9, 2010.
"Barry D. Karl and the Historical Profession", Stan Katz, "The Chronicle of Higher Education," July 10, 2010.

References

American historians
People from Louisville, Kentucky
University of Louisville alumni
University of Chicago alumni
Harvard University alumni
University of Chicago faculty
Harvard Kennedy School faculty
2010 deaths
1927 births
Washington University in St. Louis faculty
Brown University faculty